Aerocar International was a roadable aircraft manufacturer, founded by Moulton Taylor in Longview, Washington. Work continued until the late 1960s, when changing legislation made Taylor's designs impractical.

Aircraft
 Aerocar I (1949) – Single-engine two-seat roadable aircraft.  aircraft engine
 Aerocar Aero-Plane (1964) – Aircraft-only derivative of Aerocar I.  aircraft engine
 Aerocar III – Reworked fuselage derivative of Aerocar I.  aircraft engine. One produced
 Aerocar Coot (1969) – Single-engine two-seat floatplane with pusher propeller
 Aerocar IMP – Single-engine four-seat pusher aircraft
 Aerocar Mini-IMP – Single-engine single-seat smaller version of IMP
 Aerocar Bullet – Single-engine two-seat version of IMP
 Aerocar Micro-IMP (1981) – Single-engine single-seat smaller version of Mini-IMP
 Aerocar Ultra-IMP (1987) – Development of Micro-IMP with ultralight aircraft engine. One produced

See also
 Aerocar 2000, a roadable aircraft currently in development in the United States

External links
  (archived April 15, 2013)
 Areocar, EAA AirVenture Museum

Defunct motor vehicle manufacturers of the United States
Defunct aircraft manufacturers of the United States
Defunct companies based in Washington (state)